Hinksey Halt railway station was built by the Great Western Railway to serve New Hinksey, a suburb of Oxford.

History
The station was situated on the main Didcot to  railway line, to the north of the site of Millstream Junction, the junction for the original terminus at Oxford (Grandpont), which was later a goods station but had closed by 1900. Access to Hinksey Halt was via Norreys Avenue and a footpath across the adjacent reservoir. The reservoir was formerly a ballast pit, dug by the GWR between 1844 and 1848.

When the railmotor services were withdrawn on 22 March 1915, the halt closed.

Route

Notes

References

External links
Site of Hinksey Halt on a navigable 1946 O.S. map

Disused railway stations in Oxfordshire
Former Great Western Railway stations
Railway stations in Great Britain opened in 1908
Railway stations in Great Britain closed in 1915
1908 establishments in England